Rudder is an open source audit and configuration management utility to help automate system configuration across large IT infrastructures. Rudder relies on a lightweight local agent installed on each managed machine.

Rudder is produced by Normation, founded in 2010. Its server-side web interface is written in Scala and its local agent is written in C, and are published as free software under the GNU General Public License 3.0.

Features 

 Host inventory
 Feature-complete Web interface
 Standardized, reusable policies
 Custom Policy editor
 Central reporting and historic information for policy applied to hosts
 Grouping based on search queries run against inventory
 Automatic updating of such groups (dynamic groups)
 Dynamic generation of per-host policies (lessens risk of data leaks from shared policy)
 Change Request / Validation
 REST API
 Git backend

History 

Rudder was created by the founding team of Normation and first released as free software in October 2011.

Rudder 3.0 was released in February 2015.

Platform support 
The following operating systems are supported as a Root server:
 Debian Linux 9 and 10
Ubuntu 16.04 LTS, 18.04 LTS and 20.04 LTS
Red Hat Enterprise Linux (RHEL) / CentOS 7 and 8
SUSE Linux Enterprise Server (SLES) 12 et 15

The following operating systems are supported for Rudder Nodes and packages are available for these platforms:
 Debian Linux 5 to 10
Ubuntu 10.04 LTS to 20.04 LTS
Red Hat Enterprise Linux (RHEL) / CentOS 3 to 8
SUSE Linux Enterprise Server (SLES) 10 to 15
 IBM AIX 5 to 7
 Slackware 14
 Microsoft Windows Server 2008R2 or higher

See also 

CFEngine
Ansible (software)
Bcfg2
Chef (software)
Puppet (software)
Salt (software)
 Comparison of open source configuration management software
 DevOps
 Otter (software)

References

External links 
Official website
 Github account
Rudder Documentation

Configuration management
Virtualization software for Linux
Software using the GNU AGPL license
Linux configuration utilities
Linux package management-related software
Unix package management-related software
Remote administration software
Software distribution
Free software programmed in Scala